Penny Colman is an author of books, essays, stories, and articles for all ages. In 2005, her social history, Corpses, Coffins, and Crypts: A History of Burial, was named one of the 100 Best of the Best Books for the 21st Century by members of the Young Adult Library Services Association (YALSA), a division of the American Library Association (ALA).

Early life
Penny Colman was born Penelope Granger Morgan on September 2, 1944, in Denver, Colorado, to her father, Norman Charles Morgan, and her mother, Marija (known as Maritza) Leskovar Morgan.  She lived in Seattle, Washington, Portland, Oregon, and Lexington, Kentucky, before her parents settled in north Warren, Pennsylvania, in 1949.  Here, Colman, her parents, and her three brothers, all lived on the grounds of Warren State Hospital, a mental hospital where her father worked as a psychiatrist.
In 1953, when Colman was nine years old, her parents bought a farm  from the hospital.  This same year, Colman's mother joined the staff of the local newspaper as a photographer and journalist and her father began writing a weekly column, "Everyday Psychology," for several newspapers.
In 1962, Colman graduated from high school and in the fall she attended Western College for Women in Oxford, Ohio.  After two years of college, Colman dropped out of college and decided to hitchhike through Europe.  After she returned from Europe, her older brother Jon died from viral pneumonia at the age of twenty and her father died three years later from terminal cancer.
Despite hardship, Colman graduated from The University of Michigan; earned a master of arts in teaching from Johns Hopkins University.  Then she married Robert "Bob" Colman and had three sons, Jonathan, and twins; David and Stephen.  After twenty-five years, Colman and her husband were divorced.  She now lives and writes in Englewood, New Jersey.

Non-fiction writing genre

Colman writes predominantly in the genre of nonfiction and most often about women. She attributes her interest in the genre to parental influence. During Penny Colman's youth, her mother worked as a newspaper photo-journalist and Colman accompanied her on various assignments. Colman’s father, a psychiatrist, wrote a weekly column that appeared in several newspapers. Immersed in these experiences during her formative years, she developed a belief “that nonfiction is a valuable vehicle for sharing true stories and discussing issues and ideas". Throughout her childhood, Colman enjoyed family visits to museums, historical sites, and landmarks igniting an interest in history that continues today. She recognized the void in the historical record of women’s accomplishments and their subsequent impact on the nation (USA). She has written twelve nonfiction books concerning women’s struggles, achievements and contributions beginning to fill that void. Her latest book, Elizabeth Cady Stanton and Susan B. Anthony: A Friendship that Changed History due for release March 2011, continues the effort. In her book, Adventurous Women: Eight True Stories about Women Who Made a Difference, Colman defines her objective in this manner, "My intent is not to replace men but to add women (4). All of her books require extensive and meticulous research conducted solely by Colman and often includes "shoe leather research". Colman explains her motivations for becoming a writer, "I became a writer because there are things that I have to say. Things that I have to write. Things that I feel passionate about, such as the importance of thinking and learning, of equality and justice, and of sharing and caring".

Rosie the Riveter: Women Working on the Home Front in World War II received the Orbis Pictus Honor Award for Outstanding Nonfiction from the NCTE and an International Reading Association’s Teachers’ Choice and Young Adult Choice.

Her book of essays, Adventurous Women: Eight True Stories About Women Who Made A Difference, was named a Notable Trade Book.
Since 2003, Colman has been a distinguished lecture at Queens College, the City University of New York. Her academic writings include, “A New Way to Look at Literature: A Visual Model for Analyzing Fiction and Nonfiction Texts,” Language Arts, 2007.
She was honored by the New Jersey State Legislature for books and public appearances that have "contributed to the advancement of women."

Selected bibliography
 Spies: Women in the Civil War, 1992.
 Breaking the Chains: The Crusade of Dorothea Lynde Dix, 1992.
 Fannie Lou Hamer and the Fight for the Vote, 1993.
 A Woman Unafraid: The Achievements of Frances Perkins, 1993.
 Madam C. J. Walker: Building a Business Empire, 1994.
 Toilets, Bathtubs, Sinks, and Sewers: A History of the Bathroom, 1994.
 Mother Jones and the March of the Mill Children, 1994.
 Strike: The Bitter Struggle of American Workers from Colonial Times to the Present, 1995.
 Rosie The Riveter; Women Working on the Home Front in World War II, 1995.
 Corpses, Coffins, and Crypts: A History of Burial, 1997.
 Girls: A History of Growing Up Female in America, 2000.
 Where the Action Was: Women War Correspondents in World War II, 2002.
 Adventurous Women: Eight True Stories about Women Who Made a Difference, 2006.
 Thanksgiving: The True Story, 2008.

Notable works
Adventurous Women: Eight True Stories about Women Who Made a Difference, is a collection of eight enriching and inspirational stories of pioneering 19th century women. The book provides a rich and compelling look at the heroic lives of eight American women from racially and ethically diverse backgrounds who defied the odds to become historic figures. Adventurous Women profiles are Louise Boyd, Arctic explorer; Mary Gibson Henry, botanist; Juana Briones, Hispanic landowner;  Alice Hamilton, medicine pioneer; Mary McLeod Bethune, educator, Katherine Wormeley, Civil War nurse, and Peggy Hull, reporter. The book details how all eight women rose above the gender stereotypes and social limitations of their time to achieve immeasurable success in their respective fields.

The book is a favorite among critics for young readers because of its easy to read style and focus on little known women history. Adventurous Women is listed on several independent and library reading lists for school age readers.

Corpses, Coffins, and Crypts: A History of Burial is an illustrated social history of the subjects of death and burial across cultures written by Penny Colman. The comprehensive text, enriched with true stories both humorous and poignant, includes a list of burial sites of famous people, images in the arts associated with death, fascinating epitaphs and gravestone carvings, a chronology and a glossary, and over a hundred black-and-white photographs, most of which were taken by the author.. It was named one of the 100 Best of the Best Books for the 21st Century.

Rosie the Riveter: Women Working on The Home Front In World War II is an illustrated social history of the lives and contributions of women workers during World War II written by Penny Colman. There are more than sixty archival black-and-white photographs (including one of Norma Jeane Baker Dougherty, who later changed her name to Marilyn Monroe), famous posters, advertisements, and cartoons. The author explains the origins of the phrase “Rosie the Riveter.” There are a Select List of Women’s Wartime Jobs, Facts & Figures about Women War Workers, Chronology, and an extensive bibliography. Rosie the Riveter received the Orbis Pictus Honor Award for Outstanding Nonfiction and an International Reading Association’s Teachers’ Choice and Young Adult Choice.

Awards
Awards for Rosie the Riveter: Women Working on the Home Front in World War II
 A School Library Journal Best Book of the Year
 A Junior Library Guild Selection
 An IRA Teachers’ Choice
 An IRA Young Adult Choice
 An NCTE Orbis Pictus Honor Book for Outstanding Nonfiction
 An ALA Best Book for Young Adults
 An ALA Notable Children’s Book
 A Bulletin Blue Ribbon Book
 A New York Public Library Book for the Teen Age.

Awards for Girls: A History of Growing up Female in America
 Honored by the Women of the New Jersey State Legislature
 Parents' Choice Awards, 2000
 Book of the Month Club selection, 2000
 Best Book for the Teen Age List, New York Public Library, 2001

Awards for Where the Action Was: Women War Correspondents in World War II
 ALA Notable Children's Book citation, American Library Association, 2003
 Notable Children's Trade Book in the Social Studies, CSC/CBC

Awards for Toilets, Bathtubs, Sinks and Sewers: A History of the Bathroom
 Children's Book of the Year Awards
 Child Study Association and Bank Street College of Education Recommended Book for Reluctant Readers citation

Award for A Woman Un-afraid: The Achievements of Frances Perkins
 Notable Children's Trade Book in the Social Studies, CSC/CBC

Award for Mother Jones and the March of the Mill Children
 Notable Children's Trade Book in the Social Studies, CSC/CBC

Award for Strike!: The Bitter Struggle of American Workers from Colonial Times to the Present
 Notable Children's Trade Book in the Social Studies, CSC/CBC

Additional Honors
 Lidman Prize Competition, Silver Award, 1990, for Stamps
 Paula A. Witty Short Story Award nomination, International Reading Association for But Not Ms. Anderson
 Best Book of the Year citation, Publishers Weekly, for Corpses, Coffins, and Crypts: A History of Burial
 The American Library Association Best of the Best for the Twenty-first Century
 International Reading Association Teacher's Choice and Young Readers' Choice
 Publishers Weekly and School Library Journal Best Book of the Year
 National Council of English Teacher's Orbis Pictures Honor Award for Outstanding Nonfiction

References

Bibliography
Colman, Penny. Adventurous Women: Eight True Stories about Women Who Made a Difference. New York: Henry Holt, 2006. Print.

External links

 
Macmillan.com
Scholastic.com
Answers.com

1944 births
Living people
American non-fiction writers
Children's non-fiction writers
Western College for Women alumni
University of Michigan alumni
Johns Hopkins University alumni
American women non-fiction writers
21st-century American women